Alberto Berasategui was the defending champion, but lost in quarterfinals to tournament runner-up Gustavo Kuerten.

Félix Mantilla won the title by defeating Gustavo Kuerten 4–6, 6–2, 6–1 in the final.

Seeds

Draw

Finals

Top half

Bottom half

References

External links
 Official results archive (ATP)
 Official results archive (ITF)

Singles
Bologna Outdoor